Niculae Pandrea (born 8 October 1933) is a Romanian alpine skier. He competed in three events at the 1956 Winter Olympics.

References

1933 births
Living people
Romanian male alpine skiers
Olympic alpine skiers of Romania
Alpine skiers at the 1956 Winter Olympics
Place of birth missing (living people)